Rugby Park is a sports venue located in the suburb of The Range in Rockhampton, Queensland, Australia. The venue is owned by the Central Queensland Rugby Union and was redeveloped in 2013. The main ground has lighting and a capacity of approximately 5,000 spectators.

As well being used for local rugby matches, it was also the home ground of Central Queensland FC in the National Premier League Queensland competition.

References

External links
 Satellite Image of Rugby Park, Rockhampton

Sports venues in Queensland
Sport in Rockhampton
Rugby union stadiums in Australia
Soccer venues in Queensland